Sherburn-in-Elmet railway station serves the town of Sherburn in Elmet in North Yorkshire, England.

The railway through Sherburn-in-Elmet was opened in 1840 by the York and North Midland Railway. The station was closed on 13 September 1965 but reopened in 1984 by British Rail with local authority support.

Sherburn-in-Elmet is on both the Dearne Valley Line and the Hull-York Line towards Selby. Trains to/from the latter use the curve south of the station to the former Leeds and Selby Railway at Gascoigne Wood Junction, which was opened just a few months after the main Y&NMR route. This line became the main rail route between Hull and York after the route via  and  fell victim to the Beeching Axe in November 1965, though many of its trains were in turn diverted via the newly constructed north curve at Hambleton and the East Coast Main Line Selby Deviation when this opened in 1983. Since the mid-1990s though, a number of Hull - York trains have reverted to the old route to provide Sherburn with commuter links to and from York in the wake of cutbacks to the Dearne Valley line timetable (this had seven trains each way when the station reopened in 1984, but now has only two - see below) and avoid the increasingly busy ECML.

Facilities
The station is unmanned and has waiting shelters on each platform (but no other permanent buildings).  Tickets must be bought in advance online, or from the Ticket Vending Machine (TVM) located inside the waiting shelter on the York-bound platform.  Train running information is provided by timetable posters and telephone (a payphone is located on platform 2).  The two platforms are linked by a barrier level crossing formerly used by road traffic - wheelchair users are advised not to use this due to gaps in the boards.  There are access ramps to both platforms.

Services
On Mondays to Saturdays, there are now eighteen trains per day to York (up from fourteen in the previous timetable) on a basic hourly frequency - these mostly run from  via Hull and Selby, though three come from  via the Dearne Valley Line. A similar service level operates southbound, with thirteen trains to Selby, Hull and Bridlington, plus three to Sheffield.  Most of the extra trains call in the afternoon and evening, giving the station a much better service at those times.

On Sundays, there are six trains to Hull, two to Sheffield and eight to York.

References

External links

Railway stations in North Yorkshire
DfT Category F2 stations
Railway stations in Great Britain opened in 1840
Railway stations in Great Britain closed in 1965
Railway stations in Great Britain opened in 1984
Reopened railway stations in Great Britain
Northern franchise railway stations
Beeching closures in England
Former York and North Midland Railway stations
George Townsend Andrews railway stations
1840 establishments in England
Sherburn in Elmet